Rear Admiral Sven Yngve Ekstrand (22February 1888 – 30March 1951) was a Swedish Navy officer. He was Chief of the Naval Staff from 1939 to 1942, Chief of the Coastal Fleet from 1942 to 1945 and the East Coast Naval District from 1945 to 1951.

Early life
Ekstrand was born on 22 February 1888 in Uppsala, Sweden, the son of senior engineer Åke Gerhard Ekstrand and Hulda (née Mellgren). He had four siblings, three brothers and one sister. Ekstrand attended Norra Latin and later from 1900 Norra Real.

Career
He became a sea cadet in 1902 and received his naval officer exam and was commissioned into the Swedish Navy as an acting sub lieutenant in 1908. Ekstrand was promoted to sub-lieutenant in 1910 and was a cadet officer at the Royal Swedish Naval Academy from 1915 to 1918 and was a teacher at the Royal Swedish Naval Staff College from 1918 to 1920. He was promoted to lieutenant in 1917 and was adjutant to the corps commanding officer in Karlskrona in 1923 and was first flag lieutenant in the staff of the Chief of the Coastal Fleet from 1926 to 1930.

Ekstrand was the adjutant to His Majesty the King in 1929 and was a teacher at the Royal Swedish Naval Staff College from 1929 to 1935. Ekstrand was a teacher at the Finnish War College in 1929 and was promoted to lieutenant commander in 1930. He was secretary of the 1930 Defense Commission and a teacher at the Royal Swedish Army Staff College in Stockholm from 1930 to 1934. Ekstrand was also a teacher in courses for senior naval officers in 1926 and 1932. He was head of the Communications Department of the Naval Staff in 1931 and head of the Operations Department of the Naval Staff from 1932 to 1936.

As captain of Drottning Victoria he represented the Swedish Navy at the Coronation Fleet Review at Spithead in connection with King George VI's coronation in May 1937. He became senior adjutant to His Majesty the King in 1937. Ekstrand was promoted to captain in 1937 and was flag captain the same year. He was Chief of the Naval Staff from 1939 to 1942 when he was promoted to rear admiral. Ekstrand was Chief of the Coastal Fleet from 1942 to 1945 when took command of the East Coast Naval District. Ekstrand was a vociferous proponent of Moral Re-Armament, both in Sweden and overseas. He died suddenly while still serving as commanding officer of the East Coast in the spring of 1951 and was given a state funeral.

Personal life
In 1915 he married Lisa Burman (born 1892), the daughter of the banker Bernhard Burman and Tora Tjäder. He was the father of four daughters, one of whom was Brita (1918–2007) who in 1945 married the managing director Gunnar Nittzell (1916–2004).

Death
Ekstrand died in 1951 and is buried in Galärvarvskyrkogården in Stockholm.

Dates of rank
1908 – Acting sub-lieutenant
1910 – Sub-lieutenant
1917 – Lieutenant
1930 – Lieutenant commander
1936 – Commander
1937 – Captain
1942 – Rear admiral

Awards and decorations

Swedish
   King Gustaf V's Jubilee Commemorative Medal (1948)
   Commander Grand Cross of the Order of the Sword
   Knight of the Order of the Polar Star
   Knight of the Order of Vasa
  Swedish Auxiliary Naval Corps' gold medal
  Sports badge in gold (1908)
  Shooting badge in gold (1912)

Foreign
   Grand Officer of the Order of Naval Merit
  Grand Officer of the Order of Polonia Restituta 
   Commander 2nd Class of the Order of the Dannebrog
   2nd Class of the Order of the Cross of Liberty with swords
   Commander of the Order of the White Rose of Finland
   Commander of the Order of the German Eagle
   Officer of the Order of the Three Stars
   Knight of the Legion of Honour
   Knight 3rd Class of the Order of Saint Stanislaus
   1st Class of the Crosses of Naval Merit, White Decoration (22 August 1929)
   King's Medal for Service in the Cause of Freedom

Honours
Member of the Royal Swedish Academy of War Sciences
Honorary member of the Royal Swedish Society of Naval Sciences (1942)

References

1888 births
1951 deaths
Swedish Navy rear admirals
Military personnel from Uppsala
Members of the Royal Swedish Academy of War Sciences
Members of the Royal Swedish Society of Naval Sciences
Commanders Grand Cross of the Order of the Sword
Knights of the Order of the Polar Star
Recipients of the Order of Vasa
Recipients of the King's Medal for Service in the Cause of Freedom
Burials at Galärvarvskyrkogården